There are at least 17 named mountains in Yellowstone County, Montana.
 Bender Hill, el. 
 Castle Butte, el. 
 Deer Point, el. 
 Fivemile Hill, el. 
 Lookout Point, el. 
 Mail Box Hill, el. 
 McCormick Hill, el. 
 Mexican Buttes, el. 
 Mud Butte, el. 
 Ninemile Hill, el. 
 Ninemile Hill, el. 
 Rattlesnake Butte, el. 
 Round Butte, el. 
 Steamboat Butte, el. 
 Stratford Hill, el. 
 Twin Buttes, el. 
 Woody Mountain, el.

See also
 List of mountains in Montana
 List of mountain ranges in Montana

Notes

Yellowstone